Michael "Mike" Shulman (born 1980) is an American associate professor of mathematics at the University of San Diego who works in category theory and higher category theory, homotopy theory, logic as applied to set theory, and computer science.

Work
Shulman did his undergraduate work at the California Institute of Technology and his postgraduate work at the University of Cambridge and the University of Chicago, where he received his Ph.D. in 2009.

His doctoral thesis and subsequent work dealt with applications of category theory to homotopy theory.

In 2009, he received a National Science Foundation Mathematical Sciences Postdoctoral Research Fellowship.

In 2012–13, he was a visiting scholar at the Institute for Advanced Study, where he was one of the official participants in the Special Year on Univalent Foundations of Mathematics. Shulman was one of the principal authors of the book Homotopy type theory: Univalent foundations of mathematics, an informal exposition on the basics of univalent foundations and homotopy type theory. In 2014, Shulman was part of a team headed by Steve Awodey that was awarded a $7.5M grant from the Air Force Research Laboratory for homotopy type theory.

Blogs
Shulman is a supporter of using web-based software systems, such as GitHub, to promote collaborative work by mathematicians—the six-hundred-page Homotopy type theory book being a notable example. He is a prolific contributor to the nLab (and a member of its steering committee), and a co-host of the homotopy type theory blog and of the n-Category Cafe, a blog focusing on higher category theory.

Selected publications
 Michael Shulman; Synthetic Differential Geometry  May 31, 2006
 Daniel Licata and Michael Shulman; Calculating the fundamental group of the circle in homotopy type theory  January 15. 2013
 Benedikt Ahrens, Chris Kapulkin, and Michael Shulman; Univalent categories and the Rezk completion  March 4. 2013
 Michael Shulman – In Cambridge Journals Special Issue: From type theory and homotopy theory to Univalent Foundations of Mathematics; Univalence for inverse diagrams and homotopy canonicity  November 23, 2013
 John C. Baez and Michael Shulman; Lectures on n-categories and cohomology  In

References

External links
 Shulman's home page at University of San Diego
 
 Michael Shulman: Papers
 Shulman postings to Homotopy Type Theory blog

21st-century American mathematicians
Category theorists
University of San Diego faculty
University of Chicago alumni
Institute for Advanced Study visiting scholars
California Institute of Technology alumni
Living people
1980 births